Kobza is a Ukrainian folk music instrument of the lute family.
 Kobza is a surname of Ukrainian origin:
 Jerry Kobza (born 1969) is a USAC and CRSA driver in the open-wheel ranks of racing.

See also
 Kobzar